The SS Quinault Victory was the thirty-first Victory ship built by Oregon Shipbuilding Corporation in Portland, Oregon under the auspices of the Emergency Shipbuilding Program in support of America's involvement in World War II. Laid-down on 3 May 1944 and launched on 17 June), Quinault Victory was delivered to the War Shipping Administration and subsequently leased to the United States Lines Company.

Port Chicago, California

On July 11, 1944 Quinault Victory  sailed from Portland arriving at the Shell Oil Company's Martinez, California refinery on July 17, 1944 where she took on a partial load of fuel oil. Some of the oil taken aboard was of a type that released light hydrocarbon gas on agitation, heating, or standing. This could have resulted in formation of an explosive mixture in the confined air space above the oil in the tanks.  Prior to being sent to Martinez for a pre-loading inspection was made by the Port Director's officers and the Captain of the Port's office, and no defects were noted.Upon leaving Martinez she sailed up Suisun Bay to Port Chicago Naval Magazine, California arriving approximately 6:00 PM (Pacific War Time) in preparation for her maiden voyage. Some difficulty was experienced in mooring her due to winds and tides. She was moored on the starboard side headed east at the outboard berth across from the SS E.A. Bryan, a Liberty ship. Upon arrival at Port Chicago, California both the loading officer and his assistants visited the ship, gave copies of pertinent magazine orders to the master, inspected some of the holds and saw that the ship was being properly rigged for loading. The number 5 cargo hold was not being rigged, as it was not to be loaded that night. As a new ship, this was the first time the Quinault Victory had been rigged for loading. Trouble was experienced with shackles and preventer guys as they were non-standard. Winding on some of the winches were on backwards and had to be corrected. Loading normally have started at midnight. Dunnage ammunition and loaded railcars were parked on the pier for loading to the ships.  The railcars slated for Quinault Victory contained 253 tons of bombs and 5 inch projectiles for 5"/25 caliber guns.  Across the pier the E.A. Bryan was already loaded with 6,064 tons of ammunition and had an additional 176 tons on the pier, including 60 tons of incendiary clusters, to be loaded before departing.

Port Chicago disaster 

On July 17, 1944, at 10:18 p.m., two major explosions occurred 6 seconds apart in what became known as the Port Chicago disaster. The detonation of 4,600 tons of munitions being loaded onto the Quinault Victory and E.A. Bryan, registered at a magnitude of 3.4 on the seismograph at the University of California, Berkeley, some 20 miles away. The E.A. Bryan was essentially vaporized, as there were no identifiable remains of her following the explosions.  320 sailors and dockworkers were killed and 390 were injured, making it the worst U.S. home front disaster of World War II.

The span of only twelve weeks between the ship's keel being laid and the disaster may make Quinault Victory the most short-lived of all the Victory ships.

The names of those killed aboard Quinault Victory are listed at the Port Chicago Naval Magazine National Memorial which was dedicated in 1994.

See also
 Liberty ship Earlier mass produced cargo ship
 List of Victory ships
 Type C1 ship
 Type C2 ship
 Type C3 ship

References

Victory ships
Ships built in Portland, Oregon
Merchant ships of the United States
United States Merchant Marine
1944 ships
World War II auxiliary ships of the United States
World War II merchant ships of the United States
1944 disasters in the United States
Industrial fires and explosions in the United States
History of Contra Costa County, California
Transportation disasters in California
Maritime incidents in July 1944
20th-century military history of the United States
Non-combat naval accidents
Ship fires
World War II shipwrecks in the Pacific Ocean